Chhatriwali is an Indian Marathi language television series aired on Star Pravah. It starred Namrata Pradhan and Sanket Pathak in lead roles.

Cast 
 Sanket Pathak as Vikram
 Namrata Pradhan as Madhura
 Asha Shelar
 Ashok Shinde
 Ramesh Deo
 Vijay Mishra
 Jyoti Chandekar
 Sayali Salunkhe
 Sukhada Porkar
 Hrishikesh Shelar

Guest Appearances 
 Shilpa Shinde
 Rishi Saxena
 Sayali Sanjeev Chandsarkar

Adaptations

References

External links 
 
 Chhatriwali at Disney+ Hotstar
 
Marathi-language television shows
2018 Indian television series debuts
Star Pravah original programming
2019 Indian television series endings